Byrock is a small village in north western New South Wales, Australia in Bourke Shire. In 2016, Byrock had a population of 50 people.

It is named after a rock hole, called Bai by the Nyammba tribe. This became the Bye Rockhole, then Bye Rock, then Byrock.

Byrock is on the Mitchell Highway roughly halfway between Bourke to the north-west and Nyngan to the south-east.

Railways 
Byrock was founded to serve the Cobb and Co stagecoaches. The railway reached Byrock from Nyngan in 1874, with an extension to Bourke opening on 3 September 1885. On 6 July 1900, Byrock became a railway junction when the new branch line Byrock to Brewarrina opened. The branch line to Brewarrina closed in 1974 after the line was damaged by flooding, the mainline from Nyngan to Bourke through Byrock was closed in May 1989, after flooding caused major track damage. Passenger train services ceased in 1975.

Services
The Mulga Creek Hotel with a caravan and camping ground.

Water
Byrock relies on rainfall for its non potable water supply that is channeled into a large ground tank, settled and then pumped to the historical railway tank. Water is then gravity fed to dwellings. When the ground tank runs dry, emergency water cartage from Bourke is provided by road tanker, as was the case around 2006.

Byrock has one Council maintained bore.

Cemetery
The Byrock Cemetery is the resting place for pioneers who died between 1882 and 1933. The average age at death of those buried in this cemetery is 20 years.

Public transport
NSW TrainLink operate a bus service between Dubbo and Bourke, via Nyngan, four days a week.

Airstrip
Byrock has a gravel airstrip 1067 metres long with no facilities. It is located next to the town on the western side of the Mitchell Highway.

Newspaper
The Western Herald community newspaper is delivered free to Byrock from Bourke every Thursday.

School
In 2006, the school was placed on review because of insufficient enrolments and has since been formally closed. 
By September 2009, the site of the former Byrock Public School was put up for sale by the NSW Department of Education.

Gallery

References

External links

Bourke Shire
Towns in New South Wales
Main Western railway line, New South Wales